Rumford may refer to:

People
 William Byron Rumford (1908–1986), California politician
 Sir Benjamin Thompson, Count Rumford (1753–1814), American-British-German inventor, scientist, soldier, and official
 Kennerley Rumford (1870–1957), English baritone singer

Places
 Rumford (crater), a location on the far side of the Moon
 Rumford, Falkirk, a village in the Falkirk council area of Scotland
 Rumford, Cornwall, a hamlet near Wadebridge in Cornwall

United States
 Rumford, Maine, a New England town
 Rumford (CDP), Maine, the main village in the town
 Rumford, New Hampshire, former name of Concord, New Hampshire
 Rumford, Rhode Island
 Rumford, South Dakota
 The Rumford River in Massachusetts

Other

 Rumford Fair Housing Act, California law repealed by California Proposition 14 (1964)
 Rumford fireplace, an improved household fireplace
 Rumford furnace, a kiln for making quicklime
 Rumford Medal, science award made annually by the Royal Society
 Rumford Prize, science award made annually by the American Academy of Arts and Sciences
 Rumford's Soup, a cheap, nutritious food invented by Count Rumford

See also
 Romford